Austbygdi is a village in Osterøy municipality in Vestland county, Norway.  The village is located on the central part of the island of Osterøy, just south of the village of Gjerstad, and about halfway between the villages of Hausvik and Lonevåg.

References

Villages in Vestland
Osterøy